Selby Abbey is a former Benedictine abbey and current Anglican parish church in the town of Selby, North Yorkshire, England. It is Grade I listed.

Monastic history
The church is one of the relatively few surviving abbey churches of the medieval period, and, although not a cathedral, is one of the biggest. It was founded by Benedict of Auxerre in 1069 and subsequently built by the de Lacy family.

On 31 May 1256, the abbey was bestowed with the grant of a Mitre by Pope Alexander IV and from this date was a "Mitred Abbey". This privilege fell in abeyance a number of times, but on 11 April 1308, Archbishop William Greenfield confirmed the grant, and Selby remained a "Mitred Abbey" until the Dissolution of the Monasteries.

Archbishop Walter Giffard visited the monastery in 1275 by commission, and several monks and the Abbot were charged with a list of faults including loose living, (many complaints referred to misconduct with married women). In 1279 Archbishop William de Wickwane made a visitation, and found fault with the Abbot as he did not observe the rule of St Benedict, was not singing mass, preaching or teaching, and seldom attending chapter. Things had not improved much in 1306 when Archbishop William Greenfield visited and similar visitations in later years resulted in similar findings.

The community rebuilt the choir in the early fourteenth century, but in 1340, a fire destroyed the Chapter House, Dormitory, Treasury and part of the church. The damage was repaired and the decorated windows in the south aisle of the nave were installed.

In 1380-1 there was the abbot and twenty-five monks. In 1393 Pope Boniface IX granted an indulgence to pilgrims who contributed to the conservation of the chapel of the Holy Cross in the abbey.

The fifteenth century saw more alterations to the abbey. The perpendicular windows in the north transept and at the west end of the nave were added and the Sedilia in the Sanctuary was added. One of the final additions was the Lathom Chapel, dedicated to St Catherine, east of the north transept, in 1465.

In the Valor Ecclesiasticus of 1535 the abbey was valued at £719 2s. 6¼d (equivalent to £ in ). The abbey surrendered on 6 December 1539. The community comprised the Abbot, and 23 monks. The abbot was pensioned off on £100 a year (equivalent to £ in )  the prior got £8 and the others between £6 6s. 8d. and £5 each.

Abbots of Selby

Post monastic history

For a time after the dissolution, the church was unused but in 1618 it became the Parish Church of Selby. During the English Civil War and the Commonwealth period the building suffered with the north transept window being destroyed, and the statues on the brackets in the choir were demolished. 

Like York Minster, the church rests on a base of sand and has suffered from subsidence.  Many sections collapsed entirely during the seventeenth century, including the central tower in 1690 which destroyed the south transept. The Tower was rebuilt, but not the transept. In the eighteenth century the choir was filled with galleries, and used for services, the nave only used for secular purposes.

The church was restored by Sir George Gilbert Scott in 1871–1873 who restored much of the nave for use, and again in 1889–1890 by his son John Oldrid Scott, who restored the choir. The tower was restored in the first few years of the twentieth century.

The reredos was designed by Robert Lorimer and added in 1901.

The fire of 1906

The organ builders from John Compton had been working until 11.00 pm on Friday 19 October, and shortly after midnight on Saturday the organist Frederick William Sykes spotted flames coming from the organ chamber. The organ builders had been installing a new kinetic gas engine to provide power to the new organ. Initial reports that the new organ equipment was to blame for the fire were later proved inaccurate.

The fire destroyed the roof of the choir and the belfry and peal of eight bells was also destroyed. All of the interior fittings were also destroyed but thanks to the actions of the local fire brigade, the fourteenth-century stained glass in the East window was saved.

A secondary fire broke out in the nave roof on the Sunday, but this was quickly extinguished.

The abbey was rebuilt under the supervision of John Oldrid Scott at a cost of around £50,000 (equivalent to £ in )  and reopened in 1909. The restoration of the south transept was completed in 1912, funded by William Liversedge.

Later twentieth century

In 1935 the architect Charles Marriott Oldrid Scott, son of John Oldrid Scott, raised the height of the towers at the front.

In 1952 the abbey was given Grade I listed status.

In 1969 Selby Abbey became the first parish church to hold the annual service for the distribution of the Royal Maundy.

Restorations of 2002
In 2002 the abbey underwent an extensive restoration, costing several million pounds. Stage 6, the restoration of the Scriptorium was completed at a cost of £795,000. The £400,000 cost of restoring the South choir Aisle and the "Washington Window" was met in full by British American Tobacco. World Monuments Fund committed more than $800,000 to exterior work, including roof repairs, beginning in 2002.

The Vicars of Selby

Architecture

The tower is Norman, but the eastern end is in Decorated Gothic style, and the west front a mixture of Norman, Gothic and Victorian.

The interior bears some similarity to that of Durham Cathedral, on which the design was modelled. Richly-carved and moulded capitals are found throughout the church.  A major feature is the east window, which contains original medieval glass and depicts the Tree of Jesse, a popular subject of that period.  The chancel stonework is thought to have been designed by Henry Yevele.

A notable feature of the abbey is the fifteenth-century Washington Window, located at the clerestory level of the quire, which features the heraldic arms of the ancestors of George Washington, the first president of the United States. The design, featuring three red stars above two red bands on a white shield, formed the model for the flag of the District of Columbia.

Organ

The abbey's organ is widely recognised as one of the finest ‘romantic’ instruments of its type in Britain. Following a major fire in 1906 and subsequent restoration of the abbey, William Hill & Son was commissioned to build a new organ in 1909. With 67 speaking stops and 4 manuals, this instrument occupies two magnificent cases, designed by John Oldrid Scott, placed either side of the quire.

The organ was first restored in 1950 by Hill, Norman and Beard. Opening recitals were given by Francis Jackson and Melville Cook. In the early 1960s, the noted Italian organist Fernando Germani made a series of LP recordings at Selby Abbey for HMV: this brought the organ to international attention. Further alterations took place, with additions made, in 1975 by John T. Jackson. In 2014-2016 a major restoration of the organ was carried out by Geoffrey Coffin and Principal Pipe Organs of York,

The previous organ was installed in 1825 by Renn and Boston, in a gallery on the east side of the choir screen wall. It was rebuilt several times by Booth of Wakefield, Forster and Andrews of Hull and Conacher of Huddersfield. In 1868 the organ was rebuilt and moved to a bay in the quire. The opening recital was given by William Thomas Best. This organ was rebuilt in 1891 by James Jepson Binns of Bramley and moved again, this time to the north side of the quire. A rebuild took place by John Compton in 1906, but the organ was destroyed by the great fire of that year, which nearly destroyed the abbey too.

Organists

Burials
Thomas Thwaites and wife Alice de la Hay
various of the Abbots
"Poor" Frank Raw, parish clerk and gravestone cutter

Bishop of Selby
The Bishop of Selby is a Suffragan Bishop to the Archbishop of York and oversees the Archdeaconry of York, which includes the Deanery of Selby.

Selby Abbey is one of twenty members of the Greater Churches Group.

See also

 Monk Fryston
 Monk Fryston Hall
List of monastic houses in North Yorkshire
List of English abbeys, priories and friaries serving as parish churches

References

External links

Selby Abbey Online Gallery
Official website of Selby Abbey.
Views of Selby Abbey.
Selby Abbey Images
Selby Abbey Organ Appeal 

Monasteries in North Yorkshire
Church of England church buildings in North Yorkshire
Grade I listed churches in North Yorkshire
Tourist attractions in North Yorkshire
Christian monasteries established in the 11th century
Selby
1069 establishments in England
George Gilbert Scott buildings
Monasteries dissolved under the English Reformation